The following is a list of music labels that predominantly feature industrial music styles and that have released or distributed work by one or more notable industrial music artists or bands.

The releases for each of the labels here listed can be categorized by one of the many industrial music genres for the entirety of, or a significant portion of, the label's lifetime. For the purposes of this list we are using a maximally inclusive definition of "industrial" music, taking a cue from S. Alexander Reed's characterization of genre as "both hazy and changing over time." Therefore, some labels, such as Cleopatra, Mute, and Play It Again Sam that began as predominantly industrial music labels but diversified over the years are included due to their significant contributions to the genre during those periods.

Many of the listed labels shared bands and artists due to licensing agreements meant to increase distribution in different markets and geographic areas; e.g.: Cleopatra & Zoth Ommog, Metropolis & Off Beat, Wax Trax! & Play It Again Sam.  Likewise, some of these labels revived the back catalog of others that have closed, e.g.: Infacted with Zoth Ommog & Bloodline, Metropolis with 21st Circuitry & Pendragon, etc. Several labels spawned sub-labels to differentiate between styles; any of which that meet the genre definitions above are included separately in the list with relationships indicated.

Labels

See also
Lists of record labels
List of industrial music bands
Assimilate: A Critical History of Industrial Music

Sources

References 

Industrial music
Industrial record labels
industrial